Jeremy Peake  (October 21, 1930 – June 11, 2009) was Archdeacon of Eastern Archdeaconry from 1995 to 2000.

Evans was educated at Worcester College, Oxford and St Stephen's House, Oxford; and ordained in 1958. After a curacy in Eastbourne  he served in South Africa, Zambia and Greece.

Notes

Alumni of Worcester College, Oxford
Alumni of St Stephen's House, Oxford
Archdeacons of the Eastern Archdeaconry
20th-century Anglican priests
21st-century Anglican priests
1930 births
2009 deaths